Solar cycle 3 was the third solar cycle since 1755, when extensive recording of solar sunspot activity began. The solar cycle lasted 9.3 years, beginning in June 1775 and ending in September 1784.  The maximum smoothed sunspot number observed during the solar cycle was 264.3 (May 1778), and the starting minimum was 12.0. 

William Herschel began observing sunspots during this period.

See also
List of solar cycles

References

3